Escambia may refer to:

 Escambia County, Alabama
 Escambia County, Florida
 Escambia River, a river in Florida
 Fusconaia escambia, a mollusc

Ships
 Escambia class fleet oiler
 SS Escambia, a steam ship registered in Liverpool
 USS Escambia

See also